At the University of Richmond, there are many fraternities and sororities of varying social, academic, honor, and service natures. Currently, there are eight recognized social fraternities and eight social sororities, along with a number of non-social fraternities and sororities. The fraternity system began in 1870 when Kappa Alpha was organized at Richmond College and has continued to the present day. Sororities at the University of Richmond arrived in 1987.

Social fraternities

Fraternity Lodges

The first fraternity houses at the University of Richmond were Phi Kappa Sigma and Kappa Sigma, which were built in 1928 and 1930, respectively. The other fraternities met in various rooms across the campus until the university began building lodges, starting in 1953 and ending in 1959. Phi Kappa Sigma and Kappa Sigma moved out of their old houses in 1959 to occupy their new lodges (9 and 10 on the map). Their old houses were converted into student dormitories and renamed Pacific House and Atlantic House. At UR, there are two "rows" of fraternity lodges: Old Fraternity Row (1–7 and 12–14 on the map) and New Fraternity Row (8–11 on the map). In 1996, the old Pi Kappa Alpha, Sigma Chi, and Lambda Chi Alpha lodges (12–14) were demolished to make room for a new parking lot for the Robins Center.

Gallery

Social sororities

Sorority Cottages

When sororities first arrived at the University of Richmond in 1987, they initially met in various rooms across campus. However, in 2012, a complex was built which features eight conjoined "cottages" and a larger event space known as "The Web."

Academic, Honor, and Service Fraternities and Sororities

References

University of Richmond
Richmond